Clifton James "C.J." Hobgood (born July 6, 1979) is an Association of Surfing Professionals(ASP) World Championship surfer. He has a twin brother, Damien. They both compete in top-tier professional surfing events around the world.

C.J. Hobgood entered his first surfing contest in 1989 and made the Open Boys final. He placed second in a national competition the following year. He won several other championships and in 1998 he was selected as the model for the new National Scholastic Surfing Association logo. In 1999, CJ was the Association Surfer Professionals Rookie of the Year.  In 2001 he won the WSL World Championship. He currently resides in Satellite Beach, Florida with his wife and daughter, near his younger brother Travis, his younger sister Marissa, and his parents.

Along with surfing, Hobgood also plays tennis, and his filmography includes Noah's Ark, The Outsiders produced by Walkingonwater.org, Down the Barrel (2007), Inaugural Hobgood Challenge (2007), Somewhere, Anywhere, Everywhere. He has won the 2007 US Open of Surfing. He has also won the O'Neill World Cup of Surfing at Sunset Beach, Part of the Van's Triple Crown of Surfing Competition, in Hawaii in 2008.

The Hobgoods both graduated from Satellite High School in 1997.  Also, they previously operated The Goods Surf and Skate in Indialantic, Florida.

He joined the Christian surfers movement.

References 

1979 births
Living people
American surfers
People from Melbourne, Florida
Satellite High School alumni
World Surf League surfers